Vinaya Vidheya Rama is a 2019 Indian Telugu-language action film written and directed by Boyapati Srinu and produced by DVV Danayya. The film stars Ram Charan, Vivek Oberoi and Kiara Advani. The music was composed by Devi Sri Prasad. The film revolves around Konidela Ram Charan, an angry young man who sets out to destroy a dictator in Bihar, after the lives of his loved ones are threatened and his elder brother gets killed.

The film was released on 11 January 2019 along with dubbed versions in Tamil and Malayalam. It received highly negative reviews from critics and became a box-office bomb for its outdated story, screenplay, background score, performances, unrealistic action sequences & climax and prompted Charan to issue an apology letter for its failure.

Plot 
Konidela Ram Charan alias Ram is an infant, who is adopted by four brothers: Konidela Bhuvan Kumar, Sekar, Raju and Madhunandan. At a young age, Ram kills a kidnapper, who wanted to kill them as they became a witness to his crimes. When Dr. Konidela Subramanyam learns about this, he decide to raise them as their children. 

Years later, Ram leads a happy life with his brothers, sister-in-laws and their children. Bhuvan is now an chief election commissioner with Ram, along with Sekar, Raju, and Madhunandan as his subordinates. Ram later falls in love with Sita, the daughter of woman's right activist, Puppy, and soon they get engaged. Ballem Balaram is an aspiring politician, who tries to bribe Bhuvan as the former had seized his black money. However, Bhuvan refuses, which infruriates Balaram and threatens him, but Ram threatens him back in front of the media. 

Balram's brother-in-law Pandem Parasuram ask Bhuvan to apologize, but Ram threatens and thrashes him. Humiliated, Parasuram approaches Shankar, an encounter specialist. Shankar takes Ram's family hostage. Ram reaches the spot to apologize Paeasuram, but encounters goons from Bihar, sent by the dictator Raja Bhai. After executing all of them, Gayathri Devi, Ram's elder sister-in-law and Bhuvan's wife questions Ram about the happenings. 

Past: Bhuvan is actually sent to Bihar as the election commissioner, who travels to Bihar with his subordinates. Ram travels to Gujarat with his family and Sita in order to visit a temple. When Bhuvan reaches Bihar, they are captured and brought to Raja Bhai. Bhuvan calls Ram, who was at the airport. Ram manages to reach the spot and finishes 300 men single-handedly, where he gets captured and taken to Raja Bhai. A fight ensues where Bhuvan gets stabbed by Raja Bhai and Ram severely wounds Raja Bhai, thus sending him to a coma.

Present: Gayathri is devastated upon learning this, and tells Ram to take her to Bhuvan's pyre and later to Raja Bhai. Raja Bhai recovers from coma, and Gayathri challenges him to fight Ram. Ram fights Raja Bhai's henchmen and soon decapitates Raja Bhai with a sword attached to a tree.

Cast 

 Ram Charan as Konidela Ram Charan
 Vivek Oberoi as Raja Bhai Munna
 Kiara Advani as Sita
 Prashanth as Konidela Bhuvan Kumar
 Sneha as Konidela Gayatri Devi, Ram's eldest sister-in-law
 Aryan Rajesh as Sekar, 2nd brother
 Madhumitha as Ram's 2nd sister-in-law
 Ravi Varma as Raju, 3rd brother
 Himaja as Ram's 3rd sister-in-law
 Madhunandan as Ram's fourth brother
 Praveena as Sailaja, 4th sister-in-law
 Master Charan Ram as Konidela Bhuvan Kumar Jr. (childhood character of Prashanth)
 Mukesh Rishi as Pandyam Parasuram
 Harish Uthaman as Ballem Balaram, Parasuram's brother-in-law
 Mahesh Manjrekar as Chief Minister of Bihar, Prabhunathed 
 Chalapathi Rao as Konidela Subramanyam; foster father of five brothers including Bhuvan Kumar and Ram
 Jayaprakash as Governor of AP
 Saleem Baig as Ranjit Singh, Raja Bhai's henchmen
 Hema as Madhavi "Puppy", Sita's mother
 Prudhvi Raj as Dharmendra, Sita's father
 G. V. Sudhakar Naidu as Raja Bhai's goon
 Priyadarshini Ram as encounter specialist Shankar
 Esha Gupta as Sharanya (special appearance in song "Ek Baar" and extended cameo)

Production 
Rishi Punjabi, who worked with Boyapati Sreenu on Sarrainodu and Jaya Janaki Nayaka, was the initial cinematographer. He shot half of the film before opting out, due to scheduling conflicts. As a result, Arthur A. Wilson completed the rest of the portions. It was his fourth collaboration with Boyapati Sreenu after Bhadra, Simha, and Dammu.

The film also marks the return of Tamil actor Prashanth in Telugu films after nearly 25 years following Tholi Muddhu (1993).

Release 
Vinaya Vidheya Rama was released worldwide on 11 January 2019 coinciding with the Sankranthi weekend.
Hindi Release coming soon

Music

Reception
Sangeetha Devi Dundoo of The Hindu wrote "Vinaya Vidheya Rama is a unique film that needs to be watched, especially for aspiring screenwriters and directors to know how not to write or make a film". The Times of India gave 1.5 out of 5 stars stating "Boyapati becomes a pale shadow of himself as a storyteller. The problem with Vinaya Vidheya Rama isn't the deja vu factor but the fact that the filmmaker takes the audiences and cinematic liberties for granted". India Today gave 2 out of 5 stars stating "Vinaya Vidheya Rama has a meaty story which could have been made into an entertaining commercial actioner. But no, Boyapati Srinu had bigger plans with the film. A plan so big that the story defies gravity, logic, et al(and others)".

The Indian Express gave 1 out of 5 stars stating "Vinaya Vidheya Rama is like watching a Balakrishna action film on steroids. Clumsy and unconvincing screenplay". The New Indian Express gave 1.5 out of 5 stars stating "If there is a plot and a story that is worth a notice, then it is lost between all the fights, songs, dances and random elevation dialogues". Hindustan Times gave 0.5 out of 5 stars stating "The film itself feels dated. It is a mess that even Ram Charan – with all the weird stunts -- cannot punch his way out of". Firstpost gave 1.5 out of 5 stars stating "Realism has absolutely no place in the world of Vinaya Vidheya Rama".

References

External links 
 

2019 masala films
2010s Telugu-language films
2019 action films
Films about brothers
Films about elections
Films about orphans
Films directed by Boyapati Srinu
Films scored by Devi Sri Prasad
Films shot at Ramoji Film City
Films shot in Azerbaijan
Films shot in Hyderabad, India
Indian action films